Sankara can refer to:

Mariam Sankara (born 1953), First Lady of Burkina Faso, widow of Thomas Sankara
Thomas Sankara (1949–1987), Marxist revolutionary leader of Burkina Faso (from 1983–1987)
Sankara (2006 film), a 2006 film
Shankara (2016 film), a 2016 Telugu film
Sankara (Introspection), (2007) film by Sri Lankan film director Prasanna Jayakody
Sankara Eye Foundation, a US-based non-profit working to eradicate curable blindness in India
Sankara, Burkina Faso, a village in Burkina Faso
Sankhara, mental formations in Buddhist philosophy
Sankara Stones, magical rocks from the 1984 feature film Indiana Jones and the Temple of Doom
Adi Shankara (788–820), Hindu philosopher credited with reviving Hinduism
Shiva, whom Hindus, especially Shaivites, worship as supreme God or their Supreme Being

See also 
 Sankar (disambiguation)
 Shankara (disambiguation)
 Shankar (disambiguation)